Commonwealth v. Hunt, 45 Mass. 111 (1842), was a case in the Massachusetts Supreme Judicial Court on the subject of labor unions. Prior to Hunt the legality of labor combinations in America was uncertain. In March 1842, Chief Justice Lemuel Shaw ruled that labor combinations were legal provided that they were organized for a legal purpose and used legal means to achieve their goals.

Labor combination laws before Hunt

The history of labor disputes in America substantially precedes the Revolutionary period. In 1636, for instance, there was a fishermen's strike on an island off the coast of Maine, and in 1677 twelve carmen were fined for going on strike in New York City.  However, most instances of labor unrest during the colonial period were temporary and isolated, and rarely resulted in the formation of permanent groups of laborers for negotiation purposes.  Little legal recourse was available to those injured by the unrest because strikes were not typically considered illegal.  The only known case of a criminal prosecution of workers in the colonial era occurred as a result of a carpenters' strike in Savannah, Georgia, in 1746.

By the beginning of the 19th century, after the revolution, little had changed. The career path for most artisans still involved apprenticeship under a master, followed by a move into independent production.  However, over the course of the Industrial Revolution, this model rapidly changed, particularly in the major metropolitan areas. For instance, in Boston in 1790, the vast majority of the 1,300 artisans in the city described themselves as "master workman". By 1815, journeymen workers without independent means of production had displaced these "masters" as the majority.  By that time journeymen also outnumbered masters in New York City and Philadelphia.  This shift occurred as a result of large-scale transatlantic and rural-urban migration. Migration into the coastal cities created a larger population of potential laborers, which in turn allowed controllers of capital to invest in labor-intensive enterprises on a larger scale.  Craft workers found that these changes launched them into competition with each other to a degree that they had not experienced previously, which limited their opportunities and created substantial risks of downward mobility that had not existed prior to that time.

These conditions led to the first labor combination cases in America. Over the first half of the 19th century, there were twenty-three known cases of indictment and prosecution for criminal conspiracy, taking place in six states: Pennsylvania, Maryland, New York, Louisiana, Massachusetts and Virginia.  The central question in these cases was invariably whether workmen in combination would be permitted to use their collective bargaining power to obtain benefits—increased wages, decreased hours, or improved conditions—which were beyond their ability to obtain as individuals. The cases overwhelmingly resulted in convictions. However, in most instances the plaintiffs' desire was to establish favorable precedent, not to impose harsh penalties, and the fines were typically modest.

One of the central themes of the cases prior to the landmark decision in Commonwealth vs. Hunt was the applicability of the English common law in post-revolutionary America. Whether the English common law applied—and in particular whether the common law notion that a conspiracy to raise wages was illegal applied—was frequently the subject of debate between the defense and the prosecution. For instance, in Commonwealth v. Pullis, a case in 1806 against a combination of journeymen cordwainers in Philadelphia for conspiring to raise their wages, the defense attorneys referred to the common law as arbitrary and unknowable and instead praised the legislature as the embodiment of the democratic promise of the revolution.  In ruling that a combination to raise wages was per se illegal, Recorder Moses Levy strongly disagreed, writing that "[t]he acts of the legislature form but a small part of that code from which the citizen is to learn his duties... [i]t is in the volumes of the common law we are to seek for information in the far greater number, as well as the most important causes that come before our tribunals."

As a result of the spate of convictions against combinations of laborers, the typical narrative of early American labor law states that, prior to Hunt in Massachusetts in 1842, peaceable combinations of workingmen to raise wages, shorten hours or ensure employment were illegal in the United States, as they had been under English common law.  In England, criminal conspiracy laws were first held to include combinations in restraint of trade in the Court of the Star Chamber early in the 17th century.  The precedent was solidified in 1721 by The King v. Journeymen Tailors of Cambridge, which found tailors guilty of a conspiracy to raise wages.  Leonard Levy went so far as to refer to Hunt as the "Magna Carta of American trade-unionism,"  illustrating its perceived standing as the major point of divergence in the American and English legal treatment of unions which, "removed the stigma of criminality from labor organizations."

However, Levy's statement incorrectly characterizes the case law in American prior to Hunt.  Pullis was actually unusual in strictly following the English common law and holding that a combination to raise wages was by itself illegal. More often combination cases prior to Hunt did not hold that unions were illegal per se, but rather found some other justification for a conviction.   After Pullis in 1806, eighteen other prosecutions of laborers for conspiracies followed within the next three decades.   However, only one such case, People v. Fisher, also held that a combination for the purpose of raising wages was illegal.  Several other cases held that the methods used by the unions, rather than the unions themselves, were illegal.  For instance, in People v. Melvin, cordwainers were again convicted of a conspiracy to raise wages. Unlike in Pullis, however, the court held that the combination's existence itself was not unlawful, but nevertheless reached a conviction because the cordwainers had refused to work for any master who paid lower wages, or with any laborer who accepted lower wages, than what the combination had stipulated.  The court held that methods used to obtain higher wages would be unlawful if they were judged to be deleterious to the general welfare of the community.  Commonwealth v. Morrow continued to refine this standard, stating that, "an agreement of two or more to the prejudice of the rights of others or of society" would be illegal.  Another line of cases, led by Justice John Gibson of the Supreme Court of Pennsylvania's decision in Commonwealth v. Carlisle, held that the motive of the combination, rather than simply its existence, was the key to illegality.  Gibson wrote, "Where the act is lawful for an individual, it can be the subject of a conspiracy, when done in concert, only where there is a direct intention that injury shall result from it."  Still other courts rejected Pullis''' rule of per se illegality in favor of a rule that asked whether the combination was a but-for cause of injury.  Thus, as economist Edwin Witte stated, "[T]he doctrine that a combination to raise wages is illegal was allowed to die by common consent. No leading case was required for its overthrow."  Nevertheless, while Hunt was not the first case to hold that labor combinations were legal, it was the first to do so explicitly and in clear terms.

Background
Members of the Boston Journeymen Bootmaker's Society, founded in 1835 and local to Boston, worked exclusively on high-quality boots.  In 1835, in response to rampant inflation caused by Andrew Jackson's destruction of the Bank of the United States, the society raised their pay, by means of striking, to $1.75 per pair of boots produced.  In 1836, they staged another strike, this time successfully raising their pay to $2.00 per pair. Their rates remained the same in 1840, when the incidents giving rise to Hunt occurred. However, by that time increases in the quality of the boots being produced prevented the bootmakers from producing pairs as quickly, essentially lowering their hourly rate in the midst of a severe economic downturn triggered by the Panic of 1837.

One journeyman bootworker, Jeremiah Horne, was in a dispute with the Society. Horne began to have disagreements with the Society when he agreed to do extra work on a pair of boots without charging for the extra labor. The Society imposed a fine on Horne, which he refused to pay. Ultimately the fine was forgiven when Horne's master, Isaac Wait, agreed to pay Horne for the work at the Society-fixed rate. Horne nevertheless continued to breach the Society's rules, and soon had incurred another $7 in fees. The Society demanded that he pay. When Horne refused, the Society threatened a walkout of Wait's shop and Wait fired him.

Horne responded by entering a complaint with the Suffolk County Attorney, Samuel D. Parker, and by sending his cousin, Dennis, who was also a member of the Society, to try to reach a settlement with them. Dennis attended a Society meeting in early October 1840, but was ridiculed and stormed out. A few days later, on October 8, an indictment was entered charging that the Society was a criminal conspiracy to impoverish employers and non-union laborers. Seven members of the Society were named as defendants. Although there was no evidence that the Society planned to strike or that there was any large-scale disagreement between employers and the Society, Parker decided to take the case. The trial began on October 14 and ended on October 22.

Judgment

Trial court

At trial, the prosecution, led by Parker, focused on proving that the Society was coercive. Wait, Horne's master, testified, "He did not feel at liberty to employ any but society men", because he, "would not wish to lose five or six good workmen for the sake of one."   However, he also testified he had not been oppressed and that he had benefited from the Society's existence. Parker tried to call Horne himself to testify, but the defense successfully prevented his testimony from being heard on the ground that he was an atheist.  The prosecution, however, was able to directly ask several masters, over the defense's objection, whether the Society was coercive. Some said yes.

The Society hired Robert Rantoul, Jr. to represent them.  Rantoul's defense focused on establishing the benefits of the Society. He called witnesses who testified the wages stipulated by the Society were reasonable and non-members were also able to attain wages at the same rate. Non-workers were only prevented from working at a handful of the larger shops. Rantoul also called representatives from other professional organizations, such as the Boston Medical Association and the Boston Bar, of which the Judge, the District Attorney, the Attorney General, Daniel Webster and the Chief Justice of the Massachusetts Supreme Court, Lemuel Shaw, were all members. Rantoul also solicited testimony that the Bar Association fixed minimum fees for which its members could receive and forbade members from advising or consulting any non-member attorney. He hoped to show the jury that professional organizations such the Bootmaker's Society were not uncommon in Boston.

Rantoul also argued there was no law in Massachusetts against a conspiracy in restraint of trade. (At that time in Massachusetts, juries still served as triers of both law and fact). Rantoul told the jury, "We have not adopted the whole mass of the common law of England. [...] Law against acts done in restraint of trade belong to that portion of the law of England which we have not adopted." Rantoul argued, as the conspiracy itself was not unlawful, the question was whether the defendants had injured anyone through an illegal act. He stated, "We contend they have a perfect right to form a society for their mutual interest and improvement. [...] To substantiate these charges [...] they must prove actual force, fraud and nuisance."  Rantoul's emphasis on the requirement of injury recalled Gibson's opinion in Carlisle twenty years earlier, and drew from the entire line of cases opposing Pullis and Fisher.

Rantoul's efforts, however, were greatly undermined by Judge Thacher's emotional charge to the jury. Thacher told the jury that if societies such as the Bootmaker's Society were justified by the law and became common, it would  "render property insecure, and make it the spoil of the multitude, would annihilate property, and involve society in a common ruin."  Thacher also specifically rebutted Rantoul with regard to the status of the common law, stating that "conspiracy is an offence at common law, as adopted in Massachusetts, and by this decision and that of this court you must abide."  Levy wrote that Thacher's charge, "practically directed a verdict of guilty."

After Thacher gave his instructions the jury returned a conviction against all seven defendants. Rantoul appealed the case to the Supreme Judicial Court of Massachusetts.

State Supreme Court
Chief Justice Lemuel Shaw held the union's actions were not unlawful, because the objects of the union and the action taken of threatening to stop work to prevent Horne's continued employment, were not unlawful in the law of Massachusetts. This contrasted with the laws in England in 1721, in R v Journeymen Tailors of Cambridge. The union could exercise "a power which might be exerted for useful and honorable purposes, or for dangerous and pernicious ones." But only if an independently unlawful act could be found, which was clearly laid down in the law, could a combination of people to do the same thing also be unlawful. He pointed out that competition among businesses were often treated the same, and so the economic loss to the employer or Horne could not count as actionable damage. The workers were "free to work for whom the please, or not to work, if they so prefer.... We cannot perceive that it is criminal for men to agree together to exercise their own acknowledged rights, in such a manner as best to subserve their own interests." Shaw CJ's judgment went as follows.

Significance
Shaw's landmark opinion in favor of labor was incongruous with his politics and other jurisprudence. Shaw wrote his opinion in Hunt just one week after he decided another landmark labor case, Farwell v. Boston & Worcester R.R. Corp. In that case, Shaw upheld the fellow-servant rule by deciding that a railroad company could not be held liable when a mistake by an employee operating a rail switch caused an injury to another employee.  As the outcome in Farwell would suggest, Shaw was not ordinarily considered a friend of labor.  Walter Nelles wrote that, "The constituency to which [Shaw] was keenest comprised State Street and Beacon Hill, the bankers, the textile manufacturers, the railway builders."  Nelles theorized that Shaw was more concerned with tariff protection than with labor concerns, and that his decision in Hunt was a product of strategic consideration. Nelles notes that in 1842, in the middle of a depression, labor unrest in the textile mills that drove much of Boston's economy was very unlikely.  However, Whigs like Shaw may have been concerned that agitating the working class would help bring the Democratic party to power in the election of 1844.  Whigs worried that the Democrats would abolish the tariffs protecting the weakened textile industry. Shaw's decision in Hunt, therefore, may have been motivated by a desire to placate Boston's working class.

Whatever Shaw's motivation, his opinion in Hunt provided a clear statement that labor combinations which used legal means to achieve legal ends were lawful.

The degree of Hunt's impact is a matter of some debate. Levy notes that in the forty years after Hunt was decided, the case served as the authoritative statement of the law on labor combinations.  However, as favorable as Hunt was for labor unions, its holding still left the door open for courts to convict strikers by declaring certain labor activity criminal, or by holding the purpose of a strike to be an unlawful interference with private enterprise. Also, Witte notes that there were limited opportunities to apply Hunt until the end of the Civil War. Witte was able to find only three conspiracy cases brought anywhere in the United States between 1842 and 1863.

However, between 1863 and 1880 the pace of conspiracy indictments picked up again. At least fifteen cases were brought during that time.   Despite Hunt's softening of the conspiracy doctrine, convictions were still obtained and harsh sentences imposed. For instance, in 1869, members of a mine committee in Pottsville, Pennsylvania, were found guilty of conspiracy, sentenced to jail for thirty days and heavily fined.   Prosecutions in this period led to labor efforts to gain relief through legislation. In 1869, Pennsylvania passed a statute declaring labor unions legal if formed for "mutual aid, benefit, and protection" and when convictions continued to be obtained, passed another law in 1872 providing that laborers could collectively refuse to work for any employer.  The need for such legislation suggests that Hunt, while beneficial for labor, was hardly a guarantee that workers would be able to organize without fear of legal repercussion.

See also
 US labor law
 UK labour law
 Mogul Steamship Co Ltd v McGregor, Gow & Co [1892] AC 25
 Farwell v. Boston & W.R. Corp.'', 45 Mass. 49 (1842)

Notes

References

External links
 Full text of judgment

1842 in United States case law
Massachusetts state case law
United States labor case law
1842 in Massachusetts
Trade union case law
Shoemaking